W. T. Clarke High School is a high school in Salisbury, New York. It is operated by the East Meadow Union Free School District, also known as the East Meadow School District. The school serves students living in Salisbury, East Meadow, and Levittown, New York. Named after Walter Tresper Clarke, a former president of the East Meadow School Board, the school opened in 1957.

As of the 2014–15 school year, the school had an enrollment of 751 students and 51.8 classroom teachers (on an FTE basis), for a student–teacher ratio of 14.5:1. There were 104 students (13.8% of enrollment) eligible for free lunch and 24 (3.2% of students) eligible for reduced-cost lunch.

History
W. T. Clarke High School opened in 1957. The class of 1959 was the first graduating class, while the class of 1961 was the first graduating class to have spent all four years of high school at Clarke.

The media spotlight was on the school in 1967 when Pete Seeger came to W. T. Clarke High School on March 8, 1967 to sing to an enthusiastic crowd of 1,100 inside the building, and 300 flag-waving protesters outside. The concert was a year late, but it was a victory against censorship. "Mr. Seeger is a highly controversial figure, and as such, injecting him into our community in East Meadow we thought would stir passions, create discord, [and] disharmony ...," the school board said in December 1965, when it canceled a scheduled Seeger appearance. The main question of controversy, the board said, was that on an earlier trip to the Soviet Union, Seeger had sung songs opposing the Vietnam War.

Getting Seeger into the high school auditorium took court battles that went all the way to the State Court of Appeals. The state's highest court said that canceling an earlier invitation because of Seeger's controversial views violated both the state and federal Constitutions.

The Nassau chapter of the New York Civil Liberties Union filed an amicus brief to the Court of Appeals, playing a key role in the legal battle.

The high school was again brought into the media spotlight in January 2007 when the school's principal barred a deaf student, John Cave, from bringing a service dog to school. The principal, Timothy Voels, stated that his decision was motivated by concerns over student welfare, such as allergies.

The student's parents responded in early February 2007 by filing a $150-million discrimination lawsuit against the East Meadow School District, claiming that school officials subjected the student to "bias, bigotry and prejudice."

Notable alumni
Karl "Bud" Anderson (Class of 1974), former professional Major League Baseball pitcher
Barry W. Blaustein (Class of 1972), television and movie comedy writer
Jay C. Buckey (Class of 1973), physician and astronaut
Kenny Chiu (Class of 2002), (1999–present) AHK President
Chuck D (c. 1978), rapper, author, producer, and leader of the rap group Public Enemy
Dan Frisa (Class of 1973), single-term (1994–1996) U.S. Congressman (Republican), opponent of gun-control legislation, lost seat to Carolyn McCarthy when he ran for re-election in 1996
Ellen Greene (Class of 1969), actress-singer; star of Off-Broadway musical Little Shop of Horrors and film version, ABC television series Pushing Daisies
Skip Jutze (Class of 1964), MLB player (catcher) with the St. Louis Cardinals, Houston Astros, and Seattle Mariners 1972–1977
Samir Khan (Class of 2003), Self-proclaimed "Media Jihadist," killed in U.S. drone strike in Yemen
Ron Klimkowski (Class of 1962), former pitcher for the New York Yankees (1969–1970, 1972) and Oakland Athletics (1971), first Clarke alumnus to play in major leagues
Abbe Lowell (Class of 1970), Chief Minority Counsel in U.S. House of Representatives during impeachment of President Bill Clinton
Dan Middleman (Class of 1987), long-distance runner. Member of the United States Olympic Team for the 1996 Summer Olympics, competing in the men's 10,000 metres
Eli Rosenbaum (Class of 1972), U.S. Justice Department official, Nazi-hunter 
Irene Rosenfeld (Class of 1971), Chairman and CEO of Mondelēz International, Inc. (formerly Kraft Foods)

References

External links

Photos from the Clarke JV girls basketball team in their win over Garden City on 1-30-07
Newsday, Melville, N.Y. - Six reach Intel finals

Public high schools in New York (state)
Schools in Nassau County, New York
1957 establishments in New York (state)
Educational institutions established in 1957